Bicellum brasieri is a fossil holozoan. It is about 1 billion years old and could be the oldest example of complex multicellularity in the evolutionary lineage leading to the animals. It was discovered in 2021, and is named posthumously after the late palaeontologist Martin Brasier, who was a co-author of the paper that first described it.

Fossil site 

Bicellum was found in sediments from the Diabaig Formation in Loch Torridon, Scotland. The Diabaig Formation, considered to represent an ancient lake deposit, was already known to preserve the first non-marine eukaryotes.

References

Holozoa
Fossils of Scotland
Protists described in 2021
Fossil taxa described in 2021